Dongpo may refer to:

Dongpo Academy (東坡書院), former academy located in Hainan, built in 1098 in memory of Su Dongpo
Dongpo pork, Hangzhou dish made by pan-frying and then red cooking pork belly
Su Dongpo (苏东坡; 1037 – 1101), Chinese writer, poet, artist, calligrapher, pharmacologist, and statesman of the Song Dynasty
Dongpo District (东坡区), Meishan, Sichuan
Dongpo, Jiangxi (东陂镇), town in Yihuang County